Cercola is a comune (municipality) in the Metropolitan City of Naples in the Italian region Campania, located about 9 km northeast of Naples.

Cercola borders the following municipalities: Massa di Somma, Naples, Pollena Trocchia, San Sebastiano al Vesuvio, Volla.

People
Alfonso Camorani, footballer
Domenico Criscito, footballer
Raffaella Fico, showgirl
Vittorio Mezzogiorno, actor
Martina Veneruso, photographer, leather designer

References

Cities and towns in Campania